Diamond Harbour Women's University is a women's university in Diamond Harbour, West Bengal. Established in 2013, it is the state's first women's university which will impart education in humanities and basic sciences.

Organisation and Administration
The Vice-chancellor of the Diamond Harbour Women's University is the chief executive officer of the university. Kajal De is the current Vice-chancellor of the university.

Faculties and Departments
Diamond Harbour Women's University has 13 departments organized into three schools. 

 Faculty of Science
Thus School consists of the departments of Mathematics, Physics, Chemistry, Geography, and Zoology.

 Faculty of Arts
This school consists of the departments of Bengali, English, Sanskrit, History, Political Science, Philosophy, Education, and Women's Studies.

Notable people
 Samita Sen, first Vice-Chancellor (2013–2015)

See also

References

External links
Official Website
University Grants Commission
National Assessment and Accreditation Council

Universities and colleges in South 24 Parganas district
Women's universities and colleges in West Bengal
Educational institutions established in 2013
South 24 Parganas district
Diamond Harbour
2013 establishments in West Bengal